Ortrand is a town in the Oberspreewald-Lausitz district, in southern Brandenburg, Germany. It is situated 24 km southwest of Senftenberg, and 36 km north of Dresden.

History
From 1815 to 1944, Ortrand was part of the Prussian Province of Saxony and from  1944 to 1945 of the Province of Halle-Merseburg. From 1947 to 1952 it was part of Saxony-Anhalt and from 1952 to 1990 of the Bezirk Cottbus of East Germany.

Demography

Sons and daughters of the town

 Paul Lindau (1881-1945), sculptor
 Lutz Heßlich (born 1959), track racing cyclist, Olympic champion 1980 and 1988
 Gloria Siebert (born 1964), hurdler

References

Populated places in Oberspreewald-Lausitz